Ngata people are Bantus from the Democratic Republic of the Congo, Central Africa.

Etymology 
Ngatas are mentioned under various names in various sources. These include the following ones: Ngatas, Wangata.

See also 

Ethnic groups of Africa

References

Sources 
  « Ngata » (notice Library of Congress Subject Headings, BnF)
  Alphonse Engels, Les Wangata (tribu du Congo belge). Étude ethnographique, Vromant, Bruxelles, 1912, 101 p. + pl.

Ethnic groups in the Democratic Republic of the Congo